Tyrone Montgomery (born August 3, 1970) is a former American football running back and wide receiver in the National Football League. He played for the Los Angeles Raiders and St. Louis Rams. He played college football for the Ole Miss Rebels.

References

1970 births
Living people
American football running backs
American football wide receivers
Los Angeles Raiders players
St. Louis Rams players
Ole Miss Rebels football players
Sportspeople from Greenville, Mississippi
Players of American football from Mississippi